Borommarachathirat IV (also spelt Borom Rachathirat IV), also known as Borommaracha No Phutthangkun (also spelt Borom Racha No Buddhakura), born Athittayawong, was the short-reigning king of Ayutthaya from 1529 to 1533.

Life and reign 
Borommarachathirat was born Prince Athittayawong to Ramathibodi II in 1488. He was named uparaja (heir presumptive and viceroy) at Phitsanulok in 1515. 

Following his father's death, Athittayawong succeeded the throne as Borommarachathirat IV. He appointed his brother, Prince Chairachathirat, as uparaja. Borommarachathirat died abruptly in 1533 due to a smallpox epidemic; however, counter to the tradition established by the Front Palace system, the throne passed not to the uparaja but to Borommarachathirat's five-year-old son, who would rule as Ratsadathirat.

Ancestry

References

16th-century Thai people
16th-century monarchs in Asia
Kings of Ayutthaya
Princes of Ayutthaya
Suphannaphum dynasty
1533 deaths
Deaths from smallpox
Infectious disease deaths in Thailand